A Sense of Loss may refer to:

A Sense of Loss (album), 2009 album by Nosound
A Sense of Loss (film), 1972 documentary film by Marcel Ophüls